Aroana cingalensis is a moth of the family Noctuidae first described by Francis Walker in 1866. It is found in Sri Lanka.

References

Moths of Asia
Moths described in 1866
Acontiinae